Superstitionia donensis is a species of scorpion, the only species in the genus Superstitionia and the family Superstitioniidae.

This species was discovered in Arizona in 1940 by H.L Stahnke and predominately is found in western New Mexico, Arizona, extreme southern Nevada, and southern California in the United States. It is also found in Baja California, Baja California Sur, and Sonora in Mexico.

The genus name refers to the Superstition Mountains where the species was first discovered. S. donensis is normally found living in mountain terrain and under rocks or near plants in desert terrain.

Taxonomy 
This is an unusual group of scorpions because all members except S. donensis are specifically adapted for living in caves. The scorpions in the family Superstitioniidae have no color pigmentation and no lateral eyes, except for this species. This subspecies is dark in color ranging from tannish to dark brown. It is shiny and spotted scorpion. This scorpion reaches a length of 30 mm in adults.

A study done by Marshall University in Mississippi studied the anatomy of this species by looking at Dr. Victor Fet’s personal scorpion collection at Marshall University, noticed that one specimen had a deformity of the pedipalp finger dentition. This deformity could create problems with species identification if more of the population has this. Though the study didn’t look at other live scorpions to examine this, it was just a bit of information I could gather. It makes me wonder if more scorpions were studied in this species, if a new classification would be more appropriate as there are already a lot of differences from this species to the rest in the family.  .

Venom 
Studies conducted on the venom of this family presented several transcription profiles on the genetic makeup of the venom which shows how little research has been done on this species as well as venom of scorpions overall. The molecular toxins and mechanisms that makeup the venom in this family is different from the more well known species and probes researchers to delve more in this unexplored species. Overall, though the transcriptional profiles produced in this study were different from the more common scorpions, this species is not more venomous than any other species of scorpions.

References

Further reading
 

Scorpion genera
Monotypic arthropod genera